Boris Vitaliyevich Yulin (born 7 July 1967 in Khabarovsk, Soviet Union) is a Russian author. He is the author of works on history. He works for the Institute of Far Eastern Studies, Russian Academy of Sciences.
He is awarded the Delvig Prize (2020).
He is a military historian and blogger.

He served in the Strategic Rocket Forces.
Studied at the Moscow Aviation Institute and the Moscow State Regional University.
He worked at the Moscow State Regional University. He graduated from the Moscow Aviation Institute and the Moscow State Regional University.

He lives and works in Moscow.

He has worked for games companies, including Nival and for Blitzkrieg he was working on the game.

He was criticized by Mikhail Vasilyevich Popov.

References 

1967 births
Living people
Moscow Aviation Institute alumni
Russian YouTubers